TTMA may refer to:

T.T.Ma, a South Korean girl band
 Texas Talent Musicians Association (TTMA), awarders of the Tejano Music Awards